Antonio "Anthony" Murdaca (born 3 July 1995) is an Australian professional golfer from South Australia, Australia.

Murdaca won the 2014 Asia-Pacific Amateur Championship which earned him an invitation to the 2015 Masters Tournament. At the Masters, he missed the cut.

Murdaca finished sixth in his title defense at the 2015 Asia-Pacific Amateur, after which he turned pro.

Amateur wins
2010 South Australian Junior Masters, Australian Boys' Amateur
2011 Greg Norman Junior Masters
2012 South Australia Junior Masters
2013 South Australia Junior Masters, South Australia Junior Amateur, Australian Boys' Amateur
2014 Asia-Pacific Amateur Championship
2015 South Australia Amateur Classic

Source:

Team appearances
Amateur
Australian Men's Interstate Teams Matches (representing South Australia): 2010, 2011, 2012, 2013, 2014, 2015

References

External links

Australian male golfers
Sportsmen from South Australia
1995 births
Living people